Paul A. Khavari is the Carl J. Herzog Professor at the Stanford University School of Medicine and the Founding Co-Director of the Stanford Program in Epithelial Biology. He is an elected member of the National Academy of Medicine.

The Khavari Laboratory uses multiomic and computational approaches to study stem cell differentiation, cancer, and the genomics of common polygenic human diseases.

Education
Khavari studied biology and history at Stanford University then earned an MD at Yale School of Medicine. He did research at the Brigham and Women's Hospital and Harvard Medical School before undertaking Dermatology residency training at Yale. He completed PhD studies in the laboratory of Gerald Crabtree at the Stanford University School of Medicine.

Academic career
Khavari joined the Stanford faculty in 1993, and began service as Chief of Dermatology at the VA Palo Alto Healthcare System. In 1999, he co-founded the Stanford Program in Epithelial Biology with Dr. Tony Oro and has served as Co-Director since. In 2010, he was appointed Chair of the Stanford University School of Medicine Department of Dermatology, a leading dermatology department globally. He was one of three Stanford faculty members elected to the Institute of Medicine (now National Academy of Medicine) in 2014.

Research in the Khavari laboratory focuses on genome regulation, signaling, noncoding RNAs, and innovating new human tissue genetic models, with a special focus on the cutaneous epidermis. The lab accomplished the first genetic corrections of human skin tissue, defined the minimal oncogenic gene set needed to transform normal human tissues into cancer, and identified the kinetics of human malignant transformation using novel human tissue cancer models. The Khavari group also identified new essential roles for a number of regulators in epidermal homeostasis, including ZNF750, MAF, MAFB, PRMT1, CSNK1A1, EHF, MPZL3, FDXR, TINCR, and ACTL6A. It uncovered new regulators and effectors of Ras GTPases, including small noncoding snoRNAs as direct Ras-binders that modulate its function and mTORC2 as a new direct Ras downstream effector critical for the pro-proliferation impacts of Ras signaling. The lab defined two major classes of genomic enhancers in dynamic gene regulation and used multiomics and deep learning approaches to decode the combinatorial cis-regulatory DNA motif lexicon that drives epidermal differentiation. The lab has innovated a number of technologies, including single cell perturb-ATAC-seq, RNA protein interaction detection (RAPID), RNA-protein microarray hybridization, and mosaic human skin tissue models. In cancer studies, the Khavari lab identified and characterized tumor specific keratinocytes in cutaneous squamous cell cancer, characterized a new tumor suppressor pathway, and defined a new sunlight induced oncogene in skin cancer.

Selected Honors and Awards 
Khavari has received a number of honors and awards, including most recently the Stephan Rothman Memorial Award, the highest award given by the Society of Investigative Dermatology.

2021             Stephen Rothman Memorial Award, Society for Investigative Dermatology 

2018             Kligman-Frost Leadership Award, Society for Investigative Dermatology

2016             Lila & Murray Gruber Cancer Research Award, American Academy of Dermatology

2014             National Academy of Medicine

2012             American Skin Association 25th Anniversary Lifetime Scientific Achievement Award

2009             American Association of Physicians

2008             Tanioku Kihei Memorial Award, Japanese Society for Investigative Dermatology

2004             Marion B. Sulzberger Memorial Award, American Academy of Dermatology

2004             William Montagna Award, Society for Investigative Dermatology

1999             American Society for Clinical Investigation

1998             HHMI Junior Faculty Scholar Award, Stanford University

1997             V.A. Young Investigator Award, V.A. Palo Alto Health Care System

1996             U.S. Presidential Early Career Award for Scientists and Engineers

1995             Shannon Award, National Institutes of Health

Notable Trainees and their current Affiliation 

 Keith Choate, Yale
 Jennifer Zhang, Duke
 Min Fang, University of Washington
 Yoshi Kubo, University of Tokushima
 Cornelia Seitz, Goettingen
 Masahito Tarutani,Tokyo University
 Zurab Siprashvili, Stanford
 Kun Qu, USTC
 George Sen, UCSD
 Susana Ortiz-Urda, UCSF
 Todd Ridky, University of Pennsylvania
 Kavita Sarin, Stanford
 Jennifer Chen, Stanford
 Lisa Boxer, NIH
 Cari Lee, Stanford
 Markus Kretz, University of Regensburg
 Xiaomin Bao, Northwestern 
 Bryan Sun, UCSD
 Eon Rios, Stanford
 Aparna Bhaduri, UCLA
 Andrew Ji, Mount Sinai

References 

Stanford University School of Medicine faculty
American dermatologists
Yale School of Medicine alumni
Members of the National Academy of Medicine
Stanford University School of Medicine alumni
Year of birth missing (living people)
Living people
Place of birth missing (living people)
Recipients of the Presidential Early Career Award for Scientists and Engineers